The phantasmal poison frog or phantasmal poison-arrow frog (Epipedobates tricolor) is a species of poison dart frog. It is endemic to Ecuador and known from the Andean slopes of central Ecuador in Bolívar Province. They have radiant colors. This species is endangered, and there are only a few locations in the wild where they are known to live.

Description
It has a wide head and truncated snout and the skin is smooth. The first finger is longer than the second, and all the digits are partially webbed. The dorsal surface is usually green or yellow and there are longitudinal stripes.

Distribution and habitat
Its natural habitat is very similar to other species of the poison dart frog family in the leaf litter on the floor of the tropical forest, especially near streams, and in wetlands.

Biology
The species inhabits the Chocoan tropical and subtropical rain forest. Habitats include deforested areas as well as natural forests. They are found in banana and cacao plantations, and pastures near streams. The males carry the tadpoles to sites with running water. The frogs secrete epibatidine, a chemical of pharmacological interest.

Phantasmal poison frogs live in a similar areas to Epipedobates machalilla yet the two to occupy different environmental niches, and their population distribution is small and overlaps with that of E. machalilla. Genetic analysis places phantasmal poison frog clades within E. machalilla and suggests that the phantasmal poison frog diverged recently via either peripheral speciation or high phenotypic divergence.

Status
The phantasmal poison frog is listed as "vulnerable" by the IUCN.

References

External links

Amphibians described in 1899
Taxa named by George Albert Boulenger
Amphibians of Ecuador
Endemic fauna of Ecuador
Epipedobates